An eastern seaboard can mean any easternmost part of a continent, or its countries, states and cities.

Eastern seaboard may also refer to:

 Eastern states of Australia
 East Coast of the United States
 Eastern seaboard of Thailand
 Northeast megalopolis, often coterminous with "Eastern seaboard", the most heavily urbanized region of the United States

See also
 East Coast (disambiguation)
 West Coast (disambiguation)